Dandi (also Romanized as Dandī; also known as Dahandi and Dahdi) is a city in, and the capital of, Anguran District of Mahneshan County, Zanjan province, Iran. At the 2006 National Census, its population was 2,547 in 658 households. The following census in 2011 counted 3,962 people in 1,018 households. The latest census in 2016 showed a population of 4,778 people in 1,313 households.

References 

Mahneshan County

Cities in Zanjan Province

Populated places in Zanjan Province

Populated places in Mahneshan County